Ahmad Naser Sarmast is an Afghan-Australian ethnomusicologist. He is the founder and director of the Afghanistan National Institute of Music.

Early life and education
As his father, Ustad Salim Sarmast, was a famous musician, composer and conductor in Afghanistan, Ahmad Sarmast grew up exposed to a wide variety of musical influences.

Sarmast graduated from an Afghan music school in 1981. He later left Afghanistan in the 1990s due to the ongoing Afghan civil war. Sarmast earned a master's degree in musicology in 1993 from Moscow State Conservatory. He was given asylum in Australia in 1994. In 2005, Sarmast became the first Afghan to earn a PhD in music, earning his PhD from Monash University.

Founding the Afghan National Institute of Music
Sarmast returned to Afghanistan to help revive music in his native country after the defeat of the Taliban. Under the invitation of the Afghan Ministry of Education, Sarmast returned with a plan to restore Afghan music traditions that had been suppressed under years of Taliban rule. In 2006, Sarmast had outlined his proposal in the Revival of Afghan Music (ROAM), wanting to open a dedicated music school with a curriculum combining both Afghan and Western music. Sarmast returned to Afghanistan in 2008. He formally opened the Afghanistan National Institute of Music (ANIM) in Kabul on June 20, 2010.

Sarmast originally planned to offer music education exclusively to underprivileged children, orphans and street kids. The Afghan Ministry of Education wanted him to open the school to talented students, so in the end an agreement was reached for a fifty-fifty split. The underprivileged children at ANIM receive a stipend of $30 per month to allow them to focus on school.

Sarmast also placed great importance on offering a co-educational learning environment, a rare situation in Afghanistan, listing that as his greatest achievement at the school.

In 2013, ANIM's Afghan Youth Orchestra toured the United States, including performances at Carnegie Hall and the Kennedy Center. In 2015, the first Afghan female conductor, Negin Khpolwak, held her first concert with an all-female ensemble.

Victim of Taliban attack
Sarmast was injured in a suicide attack by the Taliban on the Centre d'Enseignement Français en Afghanistan on Dec 11, 2014. Following the attack, the Taliban released a statement accusing Sarmast of corrupting the youth of Afghanistan.

Immediately after the attack, Sarmast lost consciousness and lost hearing in both ears, as both of his eardrums were perforated, resulting in him becoming completely deaf. He was rushed to a hospital in Kabul for emergency surgery. Later, he returned to Australia, where surgeons removed eleven pieces of shrapnel from the back of his head, restoring partial hearing to one of his ears. Sarmast stills suffers from PTSD as a result of the attack.

Further information
Sarmast spends time annotating Afghan music in Western notation to help record a mostly oral Afghan music tradition. He also hopes to rearrange Afghan music in the Western Classical tradition.

Sarmast has plans to build a concert hall and girl's dormitory at the current institute. Sarmast is also hoping to build music schools in other cities in Afghanistan, primarily Mazar-i-Sharif, Jalalabad and Herat.  He also dreams of eventually setting up a Symphony Orchestra of Afghanistan.

Sarmast was the subject of a 2012 documentary, Dr. Sarmast’s Music School, directed by Polly Watkins and Beth Frey.

In 2018, Sarmast and the Afghan National Institute of Music were awarded the Polar Music Prize.The 2018 Polar Music Prize is awarded to the Afghanistan National Institute of Music (ANIM) and Dr Ahmad Sarmast, its visionary founder and director, in recognition of how this inspirational organization has used the power of music to transform young people’s lives.

Works

References

Bibliography

Australian musicologists
Ethnomusicologists
Living people
Monash University alumni
Year of birth missing (living people)
Afghan emigrants to Australia
Australian emigrants to Afghanistan
Asia Game Changer Award winners